State Route 77 (SR 77) is a  state highway that travels south-to-north through portions of Hancock, Greene, Oglethorpe, Elbert, and Hart counties in the eastern part of the U.S. state of Georgia.

Route description

SR 77 begins at an intersection with SR 16, at a point northwest of Sparta, in Hancock County. It heads northeast to an intersection with SR 15. They head concurrent to the north-northwest, passing through rural areas of the county and cross into Greene County. They pass through White Plains and curve to the northwest to the town of Siloam. In town, SR 15 heads to the northwest on Main Street, while SR 77 splits off to the north-northeast and has an interchange with Interstate 20. Then, it leaves town and heads north to Union Point. It intersects US 278/SR 12 (Lamb Avenue). The three routes head concurrent for about 4 blocks, to an intersection with SR 44. Here, SR 44/SR 77 head concurrent to the northwest, until SR 44 splits off onto Washington Highway and SR 77 continues to the northwest. It passes through Woodville and enters Oglethorpe County. In a curving fashion, the highway passes through the towns of Maxeys and Stephens, and then enters Lexington. There, it intersects US 78/SR 10/SR 22 (Main Street). The four routes head concurrent to the southeast, until SR 77 splits off in the southeastern part of town. It heads northeast, passing through rural areas of the county and crosses over the Broad River into Elbert County. The road heads to the north, into Elberton, where it intersects SR 17/SR 72. It curves to the north-northwest and meets the southern terminus of SR 368 (Anderson Highway). SR 77 continues to the north-northwest, and enters Hart County. Less than  after the county line, the route meets the western terminus of SR 77 Spur. Then, it heads north and curves to the north-northwest, until it enters Hartwell. There, it begins a concurrency with US 29/SR 8. The three routes head to the west-northwest, to an intersection with SR 51 (Chandler Street), which joins the concurrency. A block or two later, US 29/SR 8 depart to the southwest on Athens Street. SR 51/SR 77 head to the northwest and curve to the west, crossing over Lake Hartwell, until SR 51 splits off onto Bowersville Highway. At that point, SR 77 heads northwest and curves to the north. It meets the eastern terminus of SR 77 Connector (Lavonia Highway). Then, it heads north-northwest to and intersection with SR 59 (Knox Bridge Crossing Road), northeast of Lavonia. About  later, it meets its northern terminus, an interchange with I-85 at exit 177.

The following portions of SR 77 are part of the National Highway System, a system of routes determined to be the most important for the nation's economy, mobility, and defense:
The entire length of the SR 15 concurrency, from northwest of Sparta to Siloam
The entire length of the US 78/SR 10/SR 22 concurrency in Lexington

Major intersections

Special routes

Elberton Connector route

State Route 77 Connector (SR 77 Conn.) is a  connector route, located along Martin Luther King Jr. Boulevard within northern Elberton. It also doubles as a truck detour.

The route begins at Georgia State Routes 17 and 72, although MLK Boulevard begins a block south at the intersection of Heard and Tusten Streets as an unmarked street. Immediately north of GA 17/72 the route runs beneath a railroad bridge for the CSX Abbeville Subdivision. The road is four lanes wide until the intersection with Gordon Street and remains straight until taking a slight right curve to the northeast just before the intersection of Taggart Street. At the headquarters for the Elbert County Fire Department and Coroner near the intersection with Mahoney Drive, the road curves from the northeast to the northwest. Between the Oglesby Boulevard Extension and just past Willie Black Road, the road curves more towards the west, where it finally ends at SR 77.

Lavonia Connector route

State Route 77 Connector (SR 77 Conn.) is a  connector route, located within portions of Franklin and Hart counties.

It begins at an intersection with SR 59 in Lavonia, in Franklin County. The highway travels to the southeast, leaving the city and entering Hart County. The highway continues to the southeast and gradually curves to the east, until it meets its eastern terminus, an intersection with the SR 77 mainline (Lavonia Highway), northeast of Bowersville.

Spur route

State Route 77 Spur (SR 77 Spur) is a  spur route located completely within rural portions of Hart County.

It begins at an intersection with the SR 77 mainline (Elberton Highway), southeast of Hartwell. It zigzags to the northeast, until it meets its eastern terminus, an intersection with SR 181 (Smith McGee Highway), at a spot just west of the South Carolina state line.

See also

References

External links
 

 Georgia Roads (Routes 61 - 80)
 Georgia State Route 77 on State-Ends.com

077
Transportation in Hancock County, Georgia
Transportation in Greene County, Georgia
Transportation in Oglethorpe County, Georgia
Transportation in Elbert County, Georgia
Transportation in Hart County, Georgia